Lois Holden Benson is an American politician who represented the 2nd District in the Florida House of Representatives from 1992 to 1994 as well as various city government roles and state appointments.

Pensacola City Council 
Benson previously served on Pensacola City Council as the representative for District 1, from 1988 to 1990; she resigned to seek state office. She also previously served in the 2nd district of Escambia County.

Florida House of Representatives 
She also served in Florida House of Representatives 2nd from November 3, 1992 – November 8, 1994.

Emerald Coast Utilities Authority 
Benson was initially appointed to the ECUA seat by Governor Jeb Bush on November 23, 2004, following the October 31 resignation of George Watson. She currently serves on the Emerald Coast Utilities Authority board member for Escambia County District 2.

Bid for US House/Florida State Senate/Mayor Of Pensacola 
She has also run for the Florida State Senate, the U.S. House of Representatives, and the Mayor of Pensacola, the latter of which she lost in 2001 to John Fogg. A priority of her campaign platform at the time was to relocate the Main Street Wastewater Treatment Plant.

In her 1994 bid to replace retiring Congressman Earl Hutto, she faced four other Republicans in the primary and received a plurality (31.4%) of votes. In the resulting runoff, however, her pro-choice views contributed to her defeat (46%-54%) by pro-life newcomer Joe Scarborough, who went on to defeat Democrat Vince Whibbs Jr. in the general election.

Personal life 
Lois Holden Benson is the mother of Holly Benson and Megan Benson Pratt. Both her daughters have worked in government, with one of them, Holly Benson, serving in Florida's 3rd house district and the other Megan Benson Pratt has served as Pensacola City Council from at large district.

References 

Members of the Florida House of Representatives
Year of birth missing (living people)
Living people